Sharad Lumba (born 10 September 1989) is an Indian cricketer. He made his Twenty20 debut for Punjab in the 2013–14 Syed Mushtaq Ali Trophy on 1 April 2014. In January 2018, he was bought by the Mumbai Indians in the 2018 IPL auction. He made his List A debut for Punjab in the 2018–19 Vijay Hazare Trophy on 23 September 2018. He made his first-class debut on 9 December 2019, for Punjab in the 2019–20 Ranji Trophy.

References

External links
 

1989 births
Living people
Indian cricketers
Punjab, India cricketers
Cricketers from Amritsar